The defending champion was Mats Wilander but he lost in the final to the sixth seeded, Emilio Sánchez from Spain.

Seeds
A champion seed is indicated in bold text while text in italics indicates the round in which that seed was eliminated.

Draw

References

External links
ITF tournament edition details

Men's Singles
Swedish Open